The following events occurred in July 1974:

July 1, 1974 (Monday)
"M-day": Road signs in Australia change from imperial measures (e.g. miles) to metric.
The US-registered tug Aleutian Salvor burns and sinks northeast of Pinta Point near Kake, Alaska, after her engine explodes. The tug Kiowa rescues all six crew members.
While being towed by the tug Sudbury II off the Aleutian Islands in heavy seas, the US-registered Ketchikan loses 8,323 tons of oil pipe off its deck, causing it to capsize and sink.
Died: Juan Perón, 78, Argentine army general and politician, President of Argentina

July 2, 1974 (Tuesday)
The 24th Berlin International Film Festival concludes in Germany, with the Golden Bear being awarded to The Apprenticeship of Duddy Kravit directed by Ted Kotcheff.
Ralph Steinhauer, a Cree, is appointed Lieutenant Governor of Alberta, becoming the first person of Native Canadian origin to be a Lieutenant Governor of a Canadian province.

July 3, 1974 (Wednesday)
The Threshold Test Ban Treaty is signed between the United States and the Soviet Union at the end of Richard Nixon's visit to Moscow.
Soyuz 14, a manned space mission, is successfully launched by the Soviet Union from with cosmonauts Yuri Artyukhin and Pavel Popovich on board.

July 4, 1974 (Thursday)
The UK's Northern Ireland Office publishes a white paper, The Northern Ireland Constitution, proposing elections to a body which would attempt to develop a political settlement for the country.
Singers Barry White and Glodean James marry.
Died: Mohammed Amin al-Husseini, aged about 77, Palestinian and Muslim leader; Georgette Heyer, 71, English novelist known for her Regency romances (lung cancer)

July 5, 1974 (Friday)
British commercial diver John Dimmer suffers a pneumothorax during decompression while in saturation aboard the oil platform Sedco 135F in the North Sea. The diving supervisor recognizes the symptoms of pneumothorax, but the platform contacts an on-shore doctor who diagnoses Dimmer's condition as pneumonia. Dimmer's decompression continues, and he subsequently dies.
Born: Márcio Amoroso, Brazilian footballer, in Brasilia

July 6, 1974 (Saturday)
Members of the failed Northern Ireland Executive and Northern Ireland Office (NIO) ministers hold talks in Oxford with Harry Murray, chairman of the Ulster Workers' Council (UWC).

July 7, 1974 (Sunday)
In the 1974 FIFA World Cup Final, West Germany defeats the Netherlands 2–1 in the final match at Olympiastadion, Munich, to win the new FIFA World Cup Trophy.
The 1974 French Grand Prix motor race is held at Dijon and is won by Sweden's Ronnie Peterson.
Died: Cornelius Vanderbilt IV, 76, US journalist and publisher

July 8, 1974 (Monday)
In the 1974 Canadian federal election, the Liberal Party of Canada under Prime Minister Pierre Trudeau is reelected with a majority.
Typhoon Gilda dissipates, having brought torrential rains and mudslides in the previous ten days, killing 128 people in Korea and Japan.
Died: Deborah Gail Stone, 18, US employee of Disney, is crushed to death by a rotating wall while working in the "America Sings" exhibit at Disneyland in California. It is the first death of a worker at a Disney park. The ride is immediately closed down for alarms to be installed.

July 9, 1974 (Tuesday)
Impeachment process against Richard Nixon: Following the Watergate scandal, a US Judiciary Committee releases an enhanced version of eight of the White House tapes previously transcribed by Nixon's team.  These include potentially damaging statements suppressed in Nixon's version.
The Derg, the Coordinating Committee of the Armed Forces, Police and Territorial Army that is in the process of taking power in Ethiopia, issues its first political statement.
Died: Earl Warren, 83, US jurist and politician, 30th Governor of California (1943–1953) and 14th Chief Justice of the United States (1953–1969)

July 10, 1974 (Wednesday)
An EgyptAir Tupolev Tu-154 (registration SU-AXO) carrying four Soviet instructors and two EgyptAir pilots on a training flight crashes near Cairo International Airport in Cairo, Egypt, killing all six on board.

July 11, 1974 (Thursday)
Died: Pär Lagerkvist, 83, Swedish writer and Nobel laureate

July 12, 1974 (Friday)
Born: Sharon den Adel, Dutch singer, in Waddinxveen

July 13, 1974 (Saturday)
Died: Patrick Blackett, 76, English physicist and Nobel laureate

July 14, 1974 (Sunday)
In the finals of the 1974 FIBA World Championship basketball competition, held in Puerto Rico, the Soviet Union wins its second title.
Born: David Mitchell, British comedian and actor, in Salisbury, Wiltshire

July 15, 1974 (Monday)
1974 Cypriot coup d'état: A military coup d'état is carried out in Cyprus by the Cypriot National Guard and the Greek military junta of 1967–1974. President Makarios III is replaced by pro-Enosis (Greek Irridentist) nationalist Nikos Sampson as dictator; Makarios is said to have been killed.
A hijacker takes control of a Japan Air Lines Douglas DC-8 during a domestic flight from Osaka to Tokyo, Japan.
Died: Christine Chubbuck, 29, US news announcer on WXLT-TV in Sarasota, Florida; Chubbuck committed suicide by shooting herself, becoming the first person ever to commit suicide on a live television.

July 16, 1974 (Tuesday)
Archbishop Makarios III, Greek Cypriot leader, is rescued by British troops from Paphos and flown to Malta and on to the UK.
18-year-ole Elmer Wayne Henley is sentenced to life imprisonment for his part in the "Houston Mass Murders" carried out by Dean Corll between 1970 and 1973.

July 17, 1974 (Wednesday)
1974 Tower of London bombing: The Provisional Irish Republican Army (IRA) detonates a bomb at the Tower of London, in the UK, killing one person and injuring another 41.
A Contraceptive Bill sponsored by Ireland's National Coalition government is defeated in a vote in Dáil Éireann, the country's parliament. The Taoiseach, Liam Cosgrave, is one of seven Fine Gael members to vote against it.
The Northern Ireland Act 1974 receives the assent of Queen Elizabeth II of the United Kingdom.
Died: Dizzy Dean, 64, US baseball player (heart attack)

July 18, 1974 (Thursday)
The Soviet Union's 35th Rocket Division carries out a research exercise, including the launch of two missiles.

July 19, 1974 (Friday)
A rail tanker car containing isobutane collides with a boxcar in the Norfolk & Western railroad yard at Decatur, Illinois, United States. The explosion kills seven people and injures 349 others.

July 20, 1974 (Saturday)
Turkish invasion of Cyprus: In response to the coup d'état of July 15, Turkish forces invade Cyprus and occupy the northern part of the island.
A group of women calling themselves the "Dublin City Women's Invasion Force", including Nell McCafferty and Nuala Fennell, intrude on the Forty Foot bathing place in Sandycove, traditionally a men-only nude bathing area, to claim the right to swim there.
The first rock concert to be held at Knebworth House in Hertfordshire, UK, features The Allman Brothers Band, Van Morrison, Tim Buckley and others, and is attended by an estimated 60,000 people.

July 21, 1974 (Sunday)
Turkish Air Force strike aircraft attack three Turkish Navy destroyers Kocatepe, Adatepe, and Mareşal Fevzi Çakmak by mistake, off Paphos, Cyprus; Kocatepe sinks, with the loss of 54 lives.
The 1974 Tour de France concludes in Paris. Eddy Merckx wins the final stage and the overall race.

July 22, 1974 (Monday)
Two Hawker Siddeley HS-121 Trident 1E airliners belonging to Cyprus Airways are destroyed on the ground at Nicosia International Airport during fighting between Greek and Turkish forces.
Endelkachew Makonnen, Prime Minister of Ethiopia, is arrested, to be replaced by Lij Mikael Imru, at the request of the ruling Derg.

July 23, 1974 (Tuesday)
Greece's president, Phaedon Gizikis, calls a meeting to attempt to appoint a national unity government so as to honourably extricate Greece from an armed confrontation with Turkey over Cyprus. Former prime minister Konstantinos Karamanlis returns to Athens on a Mystère 20 jet made available to him by French President Valéry Giscard d'Estaing.
Shin-Koshigaya Station opens on the Tobu Skytree Line in Koshigaya, Saitama, Japan.
Born: Maurice Greene, US sprinter, in Kansas City, Kansas

July 24, 1974 (Wednesday)
An armed 29-year-old male hijacker attempts to take over an Avianca Boeing 727-24C with 123 people on board shortly after it takes off from Pereira, Colombia, for a domestic flight to Medellín; he demands a US$2 million ransom and the release of a political prisoner. The airliner diverts to Cali, where police storm it and kill the hijacker.
The Huntsville Prison siege begins in Huntsville, Texas, United States, when Fred Gómez Carrasco, serving a life sentence for the attempted murder of a police officer, and two other inmates lay siege to the education building of the Walls Unit. 
Televised coverage of committee hearings on the impeachment of US President Richard Nixon are resumed after a break in which new evidence was assessed.

July 25, 1974 (Thursday)
Texas Democrat Barbara Jordan delivers a fifteen-minute televised speech before the House Judiciary Committee supporting the impeachment process against US President Richard Nixon, which would come to be regarded as one of the top speeches of all time by an American.

July 26, 1974 (Friday)
Lady of the Dunes mystery: A teenage girl discovers the body of an unidentified woman at Race Point Dunes, Provincetown, Massachusetts, United States. It remains one of the best-known unsolved crimes of all time.

July 27, 1974 (Saturday)
Died: Lightnin' Slim, 61, US blues musician (stomach cancer)

July 28, 1974 (Sunday)
A U.S. Air Force SR-71 Blackbird sets an absolute altitude record of 85,069 feet (25,929 m) and an absolute speed record of 2,193.2 mph (3,531.7 km/hr), both records for non-rocket-powered aircraft.

July 29, 1974 (Monday)
The fish processing barge Emmonak breaks away from her moorings and sinks in the Bering Sea near Savoonga on Saint Lawrence Island, Alaska.
Died: Cass Elliot, 32, US singer (heart failure linked to obesity)

July 30, 1974 (Tuesday)
The 1974 Scheldeprijs cycle race is held in Belgium and the Netherlands, and is won by Marc Demeyer.
Born: Hilary Swank, US actress, in Lincoln, Nebraska

July 31, 1974 (Wednesday)
In Canada, the Official Language Act (Quebec) (also known as "Bill 22") is passed, making French the official language of government and business in the province of Quebec.
Born: Emilia Fox, English actress, to Joanna David and Edward Fox, in Hammersmith, London

References

1974
1974-07
1974-07